Jack Lindsay Doubleday (28 May 1890 – 30 October 1918) was an Australian rules footballer who played with University and Melbourne in the Victorian Football League.

Family
The son of John Doubleday (1837-1907), and Elizabeth Josephine Doubleday (1863-1943), née Naeser, Jack Lindsay Doubleday was born at Prahran, Victoria on 28 May 1890.

Education
He was educated at All Saints' Grammar School, in East St Kilda,  and at Wesley College, Melbourne (from 1906 to 1910).

He studied dentistry at the University of Melbourne, and graduated Bachelor of Dental Science (BDSc) on 20 December 1916.

Football

University (VFL)

Melbourne (VFL)
The University team withdrew from the VFL competition prior to the 1915 season; and, along with his team-mates Jack Brake, Claude Bryan, Dick Gibbs, Roy Park, and Percy Rodriguez, Doubleday was given a clearance to transfer from University to Melbourne.

Football
In May 1919, an unidentified former Melbourne footballer, wrote to the football correspondent of The Argus as follows:
"In 1914 the Melbourne football team, after its junction with the University, was a fine team, and succeeded in reaching the semi-finals.Out of this combination the following players enlisted and served at the front:—C. Lilley (seriously wounded), J. Hassett, H. Tomkins (severely wounded), J. Evans (seriously wounded), W. Hendrie, R. L. Park, J. Doubleday (died), A. Best, C. Burge (killed), C. (viz., A.) Williamson (killed), J. Brake, R. Lowell, E. Parsons (seriously wounded), A. M. Pearce (killed), F. Lugton (killed), A. George, C. Armstrong, P. Rodriguez (killed), J. Cannole (viz., Connole), A. Fraser (seriously wounded), T. Collins.These are all players of note, and in themselves would have formed a very fine side, but there is only one of them playing at the present time, viz., C. Lilley, who, as a matter of fact, takes the field under some disability owing to severe wounds which he received on service." — The Argus, 16 May 1919.

Military service
A qualified dentist, Doubleday enlisted in the Australian Army Medical Corps on 9 October 1918, and left Australia on 16 October 1918, to served overseas in the Australian Dental Corps.

Death
He died of spinal meningitis on 30 October 1918, on his way to the Western Front.

He was buried at sea, and is commemorated at the Chatby Memorial in the Shatby district of eastern Alexandria, in Egypt.

See also
 List of Victorian Football League players who died in active service

Footnotes

References

 Holmesby, Russell; Main, Jim (2014). The Encyclopedia of AFL Footballers: every AFL/VFL player since 1897 (10th ed.). Melbourne, Victoria: Bas Publishing. .
 Main, J. & Allen, D., "Doubleday, Jack", pp. 55–56 in Main, J. & Allen, D., Fallen – The Ultimate Heroes: Footballers Who Never Returned From War, Crown Content, (Melbourne), 2002. 
 Wesley College: Roll of Honour: Lieutenant Jack Lindsay Doubleday.
 Roll of Service Overseas 1914–1918: Roll of the Fallen: Doubleday, Jack Lindsay 1911, The University of Melbourne Record of Active Service of Teachers, Graduates, Undergraduates, Officers and Servants in the European War, 1914–1918, University of Melbourne, (Melbourne), p.12.
 First World War Embarkation Roll: Lieutenant Jack Lindsay Doubleday, collection of the Australian War Memorial.
 First World War Nominal Roll: Lieutenant Jack Lindsay Doubleday, collection of the Australian War Memorial.
 First World War Service Record: Lieutenant Jack Lindsay Doubleday, collection of the National Archives of Australia.
 Roll of Honour Circular: Lieutenant Jack Lindsay Doubleday, collection of the Australian War Memorial.
 Australian War Memorial: Roll of Honour: Lieutenant Jack Lindsay Doubleday.
 Lieutenant Jack Lindsay Doubleday, Commonwealth War Graves Commission.

External links

 
 
 Jack Doubleday, at Demonwiki.

1890 births
Australian rules footballers from Melbourne
University Football Club players
Melbourne Football Club players
People who died at sea
Burials at sea
1918 deaths
Australian military personnel killed in World War I
Australian dentists
People educated at Wesley College (Victoria)
20th-century dentists
People from Prahran, Victoria
Military personnel from Melbourne
Australian Army soldiers
University of Melbourne alumni